Gamble Field was an outdoor sports stadium in the western United States, located on the campus of the University of Colorado in Boulder. It was the predecessor of Folsom Field.

History
Opened  in 1901 on September 21, it was built  via the efforts of  the university's student body.  The field was named after Judge Harry P. Gamble, a six-time (1891–96) football letterman and two-time captain.

Seating capacity was initially limited to 1,000 via a  wooden grandstand located on the western side of the field, the only side that had seating.

Usage
Gamble served multiple types of events, including university football, baseball, track and field, as well as rallies and other events.  The field was surrounded by a quarter-mile track, with baseball played with some adjustments to the field and rules specific to Gamble Field.  The complex was surrounded by a wooden wall.

The last football game at Gamble was a 31–0 win in the season opener on October 4, 1924, with the team moving to the larger Colorado Stadium for the remainder of the year. The Colorado football team compiled a  record during the 24 years of use, including a 21-game winning streak over five seasons.

University Memorial Center is now located on the site.

References

External links
 CU's Stadiums, Part I: From Gamble Field To Colorado Stadium

College football venues
Colorado Buffaloes football
American football venues in Colorado
1901 establishments in Colorado
1924 disestablishments in Colorado
Defunct college football venues
Defunct college baseball venues in the United States
Demolished sports venues in Colorado
Colorado Buffaloes football venues
Colorado Buffaloes baseball
Baseball venues in Colorado
Defunct multi-purpose stadiums in the United States
Defunct sports venues in Colorado
Sports venues completed in 1901

Demolished buildings and structures in Colorado